The Old Chittenden County Courthouse was a historic government building at 180 Church Street in downtown Burlington, the county seat of Chittenden County, Vermont.  Built in 1872, it was a richly decorated example of Second Empire architecture, occupying a prominent position in the city's civic nucleus, which also included Burlington City Hall and the United States Post Office and Custom House.  It served as the county courthouse until it was destroyed by fire on February 9, 1982.  It was listed on the National Register of Historic Places in 1973, and removed from the register in 2016.

See also
National Register of Historic Places listings in Chittenden County, Vermont

References

Government buildings on the National Register of Historic Places in Vermont
Second Empire architecture in Vermont
Government buildings completed in 1872
National Register of Historic Places in Burlington, Vermont
Burned buildings and structures in the United States
Former National Register of Historic Places in Vermont